Murray Township is an inactive township in Greene County, in the U.S. state of Missouri.

Murray Township has the name of the local Murray family.

References

Townships in Missouri
Townships in Greene County, Missouri